Pleasant Run Farms is a census-designated place (CDP) in Hamilton County, Ohio, United States. The population was 4,779 at the 2020 census.

Geography
Pleasant Run Farms is located at  (39.298758, -84.549735).

According to the United States Census Bureau, the CDP has a total area of 1.0 square miles (2.7 km), all land. The neighborhood of Pleasant Run Farms is located northwest of Cincinnati, Ohio in between Forest Park, Ohio and the city of Fairfield, Ohio.

Demographics

At the 2000 census there were 4,731 people, 1,637 households, and 1,314 families in the CDP. The population density was 4,511.4 people per square mile (1,739.7/km). There were 1,689 housing units at an average density of 1,610.6/sq mi (621.1/km).  The racial makeup of the CDP was 74.13% White, 22.85% African American, 0.11% Native American, 1.37% Asian, 0.06% Pacific Islander, 0.36% from other races, and 1.12% from two or more races. Hispanic or Latino of any race were 0.68%.

Of the 1,637 households 45.7% had children under the age of 18 living with them, 63.8% were married couples living together, 13.1% had a female householder with no husband present, and 19.7% were non-families. 16.1% of households were one person and 4.6% were one person aged 65 or older. The average household size was 2.89 and the average family size was 3.25.

The age distribution was 31.3% under the age of 18, 9.1% from 18 to 24, 29.7% from 25 to 44, 23.3% from 45 to 64, and 6.6% 65 or older. The median age was 32 years. For every 100 females, there were 91.2 males. For every 100 females age 18 and over, there were 88.1 males.

The median household income was $61,359 and the median family income  was $64,718. Males had a median income of $46,667 versus $30,085 for females. The per capita income for the CDP was $22,388. About 4.2% of families and 4.8% of the population were below the poverty line, including 6.7% of those under age 18 and 5.8% of those age 65 or over.

References

External links
 Pleasant Run Farms Civic Association
 Springfield Township
 Northwest Local School District

Census-designated places in Hamilton County, Ohio
Census-designated places in Ohio